František Junek (17 January 1907 – 19 March 1970) was a Czech football player who played for SK Slavia Praha and the Czechoslovakia national team. He was capped 32 times for Czechoslovakia, scoring seven goals, and was a participant at the 1934 FIFA World Cup, where he played all four matches.

References 
 

1907 births
1970 deaths
Czech footballers
Czechoslovak footballers
1934 FIFA World Cup players
SK Slavia Prague players
SK Kladno players
Czechoslovakia international footballers
Association football forwards
Footballers from Prague
People from the Kingdom of Bohemia